Calypogeiaceae is a family of liverworts. This type of plant is a calcifuge.

Genera:
 Calypogeia Raddi (101)
 Cincinnulus  (1)
 Eocalypogeia (R.M.Schust.) R.M.Schust. (4)
 Kantius  (4)
 Metacalypogeia (S.Hatt.) Inoue (7)
 Mizutania Furuki & Z.Iwats. (1)
 Mnioloma Herzog (15)

Figures in brackets are approx. how many species per genus.

References

 
Liverwort families